The women's 53 kilograms weightlifting event was the second-lightest women's event at the weightlifting competition, limiting competitors to a maximum of 53 kilograms of body mass. The whole competition took place on August 10 at 15:30. This event was the second Weightlifting event to conclude.

Each lifter performed in both the snatch and clean and jerk lifts, with the final score being the sum of the lifter's best result in each. The athlete received three attempts in each of the two lifts; the score for the lift was the heaviest weight successfully lifted.

Schedule
All times are China Standard Time (UTC+08:00)

Records

Results

 Nastassia Novikava of Belarus originally finished third, but was disqualified after she tested positive for oral turinabol and stanozolol.

New records

References

 Page 2630

Weightlifting at the 2008 Summer Olympics
Women's events at the 2008 Summer Olympics
Olymp